Stein Gran (born 20 October 1958) is a Norwegian football player. He was born in Oslo. He played for the club Vålerengen, and also for the Norwegian national team. He competed at the 1984 Summer Olympics in Los Angeles.

References

External links
 
 
 
 
 

1958 births
Living people
Footballers from Oslo
Norwegian footballers
Norway international footballers
Footballers at the 1984 Summer Olympics
Olympic footballers of Norway
Association football midfielders
Lyn Fotball players
Vålerenga Fotball players